Prostep ivip is an association with its headquarters in Darmstadt, Germany. Founded in 1993 as the ProSTEP Association for the Promotion of Product Data Standards and later renamed to ProSTEP iViP Association in 2002, and since May 2017 the association's name has been written as "prostep ivip". Prostep ivip is a globally active, independent association of 180 member companies from industry, IT and research. It is an industry-driven association and its main focuses are on the digital transformation in product creation and production. By designing digital transformation in the manufacturing industry prostep ivip defines and aggregates the requirements of manufacturers and suppliers, intending to define standards and interfaces primarily for the digitalization of the entire product creation process – from idea to implementation.

History 
After the end of the ProSTEP Initiative of the German Federal Ministry for Economic Affairs and Energy (German acronym: BMW), the ProSTEP Association was founded in 1993. Leading IT managers at BMW, Bosch, Continental, Daimler, Delphi, Opel, Siemens, Volkswagen and 30 other companies realized that the development of modern processes for efficient product data management was crucial to ensuring the ability of German companies to compete in the global marketplace and that they can address their common aims at best when joining under the neutral umbrella of an association.

The starting point for this endeavor was the joint development of the STEP data format (ISO 10303). In 2002, it merged with the initiative "Integrated Virtual Product Creation (German acronym: iViP)" of the German Federal Ministry of Education and Research (German acronym: BMBF), which led to a massive scope extension. Up to today, the prostep ivip association remains committed to developing new approaches to end-to-end process, system and data integration for its members and providing digital support for all the phases of the product creation process.

Organization 
40% of today's 180 member companies in prostep ivip are manufacturing companies (manufacturers and suppliers), 40% are IT companies and service providers and 20% are research institutions and other standardization bodies. This tripartism is also reflected within the by-annually elected board of the association: one representative of the manufacturers, one of the suppliers, one of the IT and one of the research institutions. Prostep ivip's Technical Programme, with its currently over 20 running project groups, is governed by the Technical Steering Committee (TSC).

Cooperations 
Prostep ivip maintains and continuously expands its network toward like-minded organizations. Examples for these organizations are AIA, ISO, OMG  as well as associations like the French GALIA, the Japanese JAMA, the US-based PDES, Inc., the German VDA .

Publications 
ProSTEP iViP publishes Standards, Recommendations, White Paper and Best Practices together with its partner organizations. For example:
 ISO 10303-242:2014: STEP AP 242 - Managed model-based 3D engineering
 ISO 14306:2012: JT file format specification for 3D visualization
 OMG Requirements Interchange Format 
 ASD-STAN EN 9300 / AIA NAS 9300 Long-term Archiving and Retrieval (LOTAR) 
 VDA 4965 - Engineering Change Management (ECM)
 VDA 4968 - Vehicle Electric Container (VEC)
 PSI 11 - Smart Systems Engineering (SmartSE)
 PSI 12 - Manufacturing Change Management (MCM)
 PSI 13 - OEM-OEM and OEM-Joint Venture Collaboration (PDM to PDM)
 PSI 14 - JT Industrial Application Package, Format and Use Cases (JTIAP)
 PSI 15 - Enterprise Rights Management (ERM)
 PSI 16 - Code of Openness (CPO)
DIN SPEC 91383 - JT Industrial Application Package (JTIAP)
DIN SPEC 91372 - Code of PLM Openness (CPO) - IT Offenheitskriterien (CPO)

Events 
Each year in spring prostep ivip conducts one of world's largest neutral PLM Congresses: the prostep ivip symposium. Beside this, it invites to smaller topic-specific events and Webinars.

References

External links 
 Homepage
prostep ivip Symposium
 YouTube

Motor trade associations
Aerospace
Standards organisations in Germany